Piz Bleis Marscha is a mountain of the Albula Alps, located in the Swiss canton of Graubünden. It is located south of Piz Ela, on the range between Savognin and Bergün.

References

External links
 Piz Bleis Marscha

Mountains of the Alps
Alpine three-thousanders
Mountains of Switzerland
Mountains of Graubünden
Bergün Filisur
Surses